Donaldo Ross (1904 – 1972) was a Uruguayan football player and manager.

Early and personal life
Ross was born in 1904 in Montevideo. His brother was Conrado Ross.

Career
Ross spent his early career in Uruguay with Charley and Defensor. He then played in Brazil for 14 de Julho, Internacional and Pelotas. He finished his career in Chile with Santiago.

After retiring as a player he became a manager, including for Colo-Colo in Chile, Millonarios in Colombia, and Guadalajara and Necaxa in Mexico.

Later life and death
He died in Guadalajara in 1972, suffering an acute myocardial infarction whilst riding on the bus.

References

1904 births
1972 deaths
Uruguayan footballers
Defensor Sporting players
Sport Club Internacional players
Esporte Clube Pelotas players
Association football midfielders
Uruguayan football managers
Colo-Colo managers
Millonarios F.C. managers
C.D. Guadalajara managers
Club Necaxa managers
Uruguayan expatriate footballers
Uruguayan expatriate football managers
Uruguayan expatriates in Brazil
Expatriate footballers in Brazil
Uruguayan expatriates in Chile
Expatriate footballers in Chile
Expatriate football managers in Chile
Uruguayan expatriates in Colombia
Expatriate football managers in Colombia
Uruguayan expatriates in Mexico
Expatriate football managers in Mexico